Talke was a ward in the Borough of Newcastle-under-Lyme. It covered the villages of Talke and Talke Pits. As of the 2018 Newcastle-under-Lyme Borough Council election this ward has been merged with Butt Lane ward, to form the Talke and Butt Lane Ward.

References

Wards of the Borough of Newcastle-under-Lyme